Middlezoy is a village and civil parish on the Somerset Levels in the Sedgemoor district of Somerset, England. Situated between the two other villages of Westonzoyland and Othery and is about six miles from the Town of Bridgwater which is on the tidal river Parret.

History

The name Middlezoy meaning the middle stream island, derives from Sowi, the name of Glastonbury Abbey's major estate, sow, a British river name from a root meaning flowing. The extra i is derived from the Saxon ig for island.

The parish of Middlezoy was part of the Whitley Hundred.

In 1800 1,100 acres of common land were enclosed as a result of the Inclosure Acts.

In 2006 the village shop closed and a grant was obtained for the erection of a new modular structure to house a community shop and post office.

Middlezoy Aerodrome started operating in 2018 on the south side of RAF Weston Zoyland. A hangar and an original Nissen hut have been erected. Restoration of various types including the Piston Provost is ongoing by The Somerset Aeroplane Company. A Meteor T.7 gate guard can be seen from the A372 main road. Middlezoy Aerodrome hold a show every summer called The Somerset Aerofest.

Governance

The parish council has responsibility for local issues, including setting an annual precept (local rate) to cover the council's operating costs and producing annual accounts for public scrutiny. The parish council evaluates local planning applications and works with the local police, district council officers, and neighbourhood watch groups on matters of crime, security, and traffic. The parish council's role also includes initiating projects for the maintenance and repair of parish facilities, as well as consulting with the district council on the maintenance, repair, and improvement of highways, drainage, footpaths, public transport, and street cleaning. Conservation matters (including trees and listed buildings) and environmental issues are also the responsibility of the council.

The village falls within the Non-metropolitan district of Sedgemoor, which was formed on 1 April 1974 under the Local Government Act 1972, having previously been part of Bridgwater Rural District, which is responsible for local planning and building control, local roads, council housing, environmental health, markets and fairs, refuse collection and recycling, cemeteries and crematoria, leisure services, parks, and tourism.

Somerset County Council is responsible for running the largest and most expensive local services such as education, social services, libraries, main roads, public transport, policing and fire services, trading standards, waste disposal and strategic planning.

It is also part of a county constituency represented in the House of Commons of the Parliament of the United Kingdom. It elects one Member of Parliament (MP) by the first past the post system of election.

Geography

Just to the north of the village is the Greylake Site of Special Scientific Interest, which consists of 20 low-lying fields in the north west corner of King's Sedgemoor, and includes the Royal Society for the Protection of Birds Greylake nature reserve. This location is the type section for the Pleistocene Burtle Beds, as it is probably the most complete Burtle Beds sequence in Somerset. It demonstrates a sequence of fluvial (or possibly glacial) gravels, marine intertidal silts and marine subtidal. Rich molluscan, ostracod and foraminifer assemblages and a mammalian fauna, including Red Deer (Cervus elephus), Aurochs (Bos primigenius) and Fallow Deer (Dama cf dama) have been recorded.

Religious sites

Holy Cross church Middlezoy dates from the 13th century. It has a three-stage tower similar to that at Lyng and has been designated by English Heritage as a grade I listed building. William of Bitton II was the rector by 20 April 1263.

References

External links

 Middlezoy Aerodrome

Villages in Sedgemoor
Civil parishes in Somerset